Georges Marcel Émile Nicolas Perron  (12 January 1925 – 6 May 2021) was a French prelate of the Catholic Church. He served as bishop of Djibouti from 1992 until his retirement in 2001.

Georges Perron was born on January 12, 1925, as the second in a family of six children. He entered the Order of Friars Minor Capuchin, did his profession in 1945 and was ordained a priest on June 29, 1951 in the Nantes Cathedral. In 1955, he turned as a missionary to Ethiopia.

Pope John Paul II appointed him bishop of Djibouti in Africa on November 21, 1992. On March 14, 1993, Perron was consecrated a bishop. He was bishop of Djibouti until his retirement age on March 13, 2001. After his retirement, he returned to France. He died in Angers, France on 6 May 2021.

References

External links
 Catholic-Hierarchy

1925 births
2021 deaths
Capuchin bishops
French Roman Catholic bishops in Africa
People from Maine-et-Loire
Roman Catholic bishops of Djibouti
French expatriates in Ethiopia